The Kivu ground thrush (Geokichla piaggiae tanganicae) is a bird subspecies native to the Albertine Rift montane forests. Its natural habitat is subtropical or tropical moist montane forests. It is threatened by habitat loss.

It is currently considered a subspecies of the Abyssinian ground thrush.

References

BirdLife International 2013. Zoothera tanganjicae.

Kivu ground thrush
Birds of Central Africa
Kivu ground thrush
Taxonomy articles created by Polbot